The 2015 Brasil Tennis Cup was a women's tennis tournament played on outdoor clay courts. It was the 3rd edition of the Brasil Tennis Cup, in the International category of the 2015 WTA Tour. It took place in Florianópolis, Brazil, from July 27 through August 1, 2015.

Points and prize money

Point distribution

Prize money

Singles main draw entrants

Seeds 

 Rankings are as of July 20, 2015.

Other entrants 
The following players received wildcards into the singles main draw:
  Carolina Alves
  Maria Fernanda Alves 
  Luisa Stefani

The following players received entry from the qualifying draw:
  Cindy Burger 
  Susanne Celik 
  Andrea Gámiz
  Quirine Lemoine
  Anastasia Pivovarova 
  Laura Pous Tió

Withdrawals 
Before the tournament
  Beatriz Haddad Maia → replaced by  Anastasija Sevastova
  Johanna Larsson → replaced by  Paula Ormaechea 
  Yulia Putintseva → replaced by  Tereza Martincová
  Sara Sorribes Tormo → replaced by  Gabriela Cé

Doubles main draw entrants

Seeds 

 Rankings are as of July 20, 2015.

Other entrants 
The following pairs received wildcards into the doubles main draw:
  Carolina Alves /  Luisa Stefani 
  Erika Drozd Pereira /  Ingrid Gamarra Martins

Withdrawals 
During the tournament
  Cindy Burger (right elbow injury)

Champions

Singles 

  Teliana Pereira def.  Annika Beck, 6–4, 4–6, 6–1

Doubles 

  Annika Beck /  Laura Siegemund def.  María Irigoyen /  Paula Kania, 6–3, 7–6(7–1)

External links 
 Official website

Brasil Tennis Cup
Brasil Tennis Cup
2015 in Brazilian tennis